Lorenzo Ostuni (born 7 April 1995), known online as Favij or FavijTV, is an Italian YouTuber. With over six million subscribers and four billion views, Ostuni has been described as one of the most popular YouTubers in Italy. He is also the most followed Italian YouTuber.

Life and career

Internet career and milestones 
Ostuni was born in Mappano, Turin, and took a computer course at ITIS Carlo Grassi. In 2011, he and two friends began a YouTube channel called "TheSharedGaming". On 9 December 2012, Ostuni created a solo channel named "FavijTV", which reached 100,000 subscribers in 2013 and one million subscribers in 2014, the first Italian to cross the milestone. In December 2018, Ostuni reached five million subscribers, becoming the first Italian YouTuber to do so; he also appeared on YouTube Rewind 2018. He created a second channel named "JIVAF" in 2019. By 2021, his channel was managed by the agency Webstars Channel.

Ostuni is the first professional YouTuber in Italy, as well as the most followed. He lives in Milan. In 2021, Vodafone gave him a new gaming-oriented house to promote their Game Now 5G platform.

Other work 
In 2015, Ostuni made his acting debut in Game Therapy and Mondadori published his first book, an autobiography titled Sotto le cuffie. His second book The Cage was released three years later.  Ostuni has also dubbed characters in Disney films such as Ralph Breaks the Internet (2018) and Onward (2020) and was a judge on the 2019 Just Dance: World Cup. He has a line of collectible stickers from Panini Group.

Internet content 
Ostuni's content mainly consists of Let's Plays, but he also began creating vlogs. After becoming a professional YouTuber, he has stopped using profanity in his videos.

References

Further reading

External links 

 Official channel

1996 births
Italian YouTubers
Living people
People from Turin
YouTube channels launched in 2012